Fútbol Club Universidad Autónoma del Estado de Hidalgo was Mexican football club that played in the Liga Premier in the Serie B. The club was based in Pachuca, Hidalgo. The club was an affiliate to the Mexican football club C.F. Pachuca and also represented the Universidad Autónoma del Estado de Hidalgo.

Players

Current squad

See also
Football in Mexico

External links
Official Club Page

Football clubs in Hidalgo (state)
2000 establishments in Mexico